Although not as prominent as its eastern namesake, Northland's Mount Hikurangi is also of note. At 625 metres, this peak overlooks central Northland and is a prominent peak on the skyline at the Bay of Islands, the site of the first permanent European settlement in New Zealand.

There is also a volcanic cone near Hikurangi, 365 metres high, called Hikurangi.

References
 

Hik